The 2016–17 USHL season is the 38th season of the United States Hockey League as an all-junior league. The regular season ran from September 23, 2016, to April 8, 2017. The regular season champions, the Sioux City Musketeers, were awarded the Anderson Cup. The playoff champions, the Chicago Steel, were awarded the Clark Cup.

Regular season
Final standings

Eastern Conference

Western Conference

x = clinched playoff berth; y = clinched conference title; z = clinched regular season title

Post season awards

USHL awards

All-USHL First Team

All-USHL Second Team

All Rookie Team

Clark Cup playoffs

References

External links
 Official website of the United States Hockey League

United States Hockey League seasons
USHL